Zvejnieks (Old orthography: Sweineek(s); feminine: Zvejniece) is a Latvian occupational surname, derived from the Latvian word for "fisherman". Individuals with the surname include:

Kristaps Zvejnieks (born 1992), an Alpine ski racer and inline Alpine slalom race;
Roberts Zvejnieks (born 1997), a short track speed skater.

Occupational surnames
Latvian-language masculine surnames